SM UB-128 was a German Type UB III submarine or U-boat in the German Imperial Navy during World War I. She was commissioned into the German Imperial Navy on 11 May 1918 as SM UB-128.

UB-128 was surrendered to the Allies at Harwich on 3 February 1919 in accordance with the requirements of the Armistice with Germany. After passing into British hands, UB-128 was towed to Falmouth along with five other U-boats  for use in a series of explosive test trials by the Royal Navy in Falmouth Bay, in order to find weaknesses in their design. Following her use on 1 February 1921, UB-128 was dumped on Castle Beach and sold to R. Roskelly & Rodgers on 19 April 1921 for scrap (for £120), and partially salvaged over the following decades, although parts remain in situ.

Construction

She was built by AG Weser of Bremen and following just under a year of construction, launched at Bremen on 10 April 1918. UB-128 was commissioned later the same year under the command of Kptlt. Wilhelm Canaris. Like all Type UB III submarines, UB-128 carried 10 torpedoes and was armed with a  deck gun. UB-128 had a displacement of  while surfaced and  when submerged. Her engines enabled her to travel at  when surfaced and  when submerged.

Summary of raiding history

References

Notes

Citations

Bibliography 

 

German Type UB III submarines
World War I submarines of Germany
U-boats commissioned in 1918
1918 ships
Ships built in Bremen (state)